is one of the eight titles in Japanese professional shogi, and is the most prestigious title, along with Ryūō. The word meijin (名 mei "excellent, artful", 人 jin "person") refers to a highly skilled master of a certain field (the various arts found in traditional Japanese culture, such as the Japanese tea ceremony, go, competitive karuta, rakugo, budō).

History

The Meijin institution started in the 17th century (Edo period), and for around 300 years (1612–1937) was a hereditary title that was passed from the reigning Meijin upon his retirement or death to another selected from three families, as deemed to be worthy. This is known as the Lifetime Meijin system (終生名人制). In 1935, however, the Japan Shogi Association, or JSA, announced that it was abolishing the existing system of succession in favor of something more short-term and reflective of actual playing strength, known as the Real Strength Meijin system (実力名人制). In 1937, the reigning 13th Meijin , who had received his title under the old system and was 70 years old at the time, voluntarily gave up his title so that a new Meijin could be decided through actual tournament play. Later that year Yoshio Kimura, who was a student of Sekine, became the first Meijin to gain the title based upon actual performance by winning a tournament which included eight other top players. From 1937 to 1947, the challenger for the Meijin title was determined through tournaments involving a select number of players. Finally, in 1947, the JSA officially established the preliminary round of  that it currently uses.

Qualifying

The Meijin title is only open to professional shogi players that are members of the Meijin tournament system. This means that unlike some other tournaments  amateur players, women's professional players, and regular professionals outside of the Meijin tournament system are not allowed to compete in the tournament.

The Meijin ranking tournaments are divided into five classes (A, B1, B2, C1, C2) and players compete against others within their class in a round-robin tournament throughout the year. Players who perform well during their class tournament may be promoted to the next highest class while those who perform poorly may be relegated to the next lowest one. New professionals are placed at the bottom of Class C2, and the top three players of Class C2 are promoted to Class C1 for the next year. Similarly, the top two players of Classes C1, B2, B1 are promoted to the B2, B1, and A, respectively, for the next year. A new professional, therefore, needs at least five years experience (five successive promotions) after their debut before they can qualify to challenge for the title of Meijin.

Lifetime Meijin 

The first thirteen  were determined through succession. The Lifetime Meijin as a competitive title, was established by the JSA in 1952. Players who capture the Meijin title five times (does not have to be consecutive) qualify to receive this title, but are only officially awarded it upon their retirement or death (with exceptions).

 1st: 
 2nd: 
 3rd: 
 4th: 
 5th: 
 6th: 
 7th: 
 8th: 
 9th: 
 10th: 
 11th: 
 12th: 
 13th:  (last name spelled: 關根 or 関根)
14th Lifetime Meijin: Yoshio Kimura (Qualified for title in 1946 at age 41. Awarded in 1952 upon retirement)
15th Lifetime Meijin: Yasuharu Ōyama (Qualified for title at age 33 in 1956. Awarded in 1976)
16th Lifetime Meijin: Makoto Nakahara (Qualified for title at age 29 in 1976. Awarded in 2007, prior to his retirement in 2009 ) 
17th Lifetime Meijin: Koji Tanigawa (Qualified for title at age 35 in 1997. Still active)
18th Lifetime Meijin: Toshiyuki Moriuchi (Qualified for title in 2007 at age 36. Still active)
19th Lifetime Meijin: Yoshiharu Habu (Qualified for title in 2008 at age 37. Still active)

Honorary Meijin 

The  is another Mejin-related title. Only two have received this title, Kensosuke Kosuke in 1936 and Ichitarō Doi in 1954.

Posthumous Meijin 

A special  title was given to Sankichi Sakata in 1955 by the Japan Shogi Association after his death in 1945. Sakata, a folk hero for the Osaka area, was known during his heyday for his brilliant, inventive playing but was prevented from becoming a normal Meijin by circumstances. Sakata is the only person to receive this title.

Past winners 
Below is a list of past Meijin title holders from 1937 when the new tournament method for determining the title holder was established. The number in parenthesis represents the cumulative times the player had won the title to date.

Records
 Most titles overall: Yasuharu Ōyama, 18
 Most consecutive titles: Yasuharu Ōyama, 13 in a row (1959-1971).
 Oldest player to win title: Kunio Yonenaga, 49 years 11 months (1993)
 Youngest player to win title: Koji Tanigawa, 21 years old (1983)
 Oldest player to challenge for title: Yasuharu Ōyama, 63 years old (1986)
 Youngest player to challenge for title: Hifumi Katoh, 20 years old (1960)  
 Most times recapturing title: Yoshiharu Habu, 3
 Longest period between titles: Yoshiharu Habu, 6 years (1997-2002)

Players by Meijin class 

Below is a list of professional players grouped by their class for the 81st Meijin league including their rank in dan . The current Meijin title holder is Akira Watanabe.

Other professional players not listed here do not participate in the Meijin league and are known as Free Class (フリークラス furii kurasu) players. There were 32 such players .

See also 

Meijin (Go)

Notes

References

External links
JSA page: 名人戦・順位戦
 I-tsu-tsu Blog: 
 Let’s Learn More About The Meijin Title Match!
 Behind the Scenes on the Previous Day of the Meijin Title Match

 
Shogi tournaments